Chaboksar District is a district (bakhsh) in Rudsar County, Gilan Province, Iran. At the 2006 census, its population was 25,146, in 7,331 families. The district has one city: Chaboksar. The district has two rural districts (dehestan): Owshiyan Rural District and Siahkalrud Rural District.

References

Rudsar County
Districts of Gilan Province